"Almost Easy" is a song by American heavy metal band Avenged Sevenfold. It is the second song as well as second single from their self-titled fourth album.

Background
The song first premiered at a concert in Virginia during Avenged Sevenfold's appearances during 2007's Warped Tour. The song was officially released on September 18, 2007 through online music stores such as iTunes and URGE.

The song was written by the band's drummer, James "The Rev" Sullivan. In the second chorus the whole band sang simultaneously - all 5 members combined their voices for more of a choir sound, which was shown in the MVI that came along with their self-titled album.

The song was included on Transformers: Revenge of the Fallen soundtrack. Originally, it was planned to be on the 2007 Transformers soundtrack; however, it was not finished in time.

The song is available as downloadable content for Guitar Hero III: Legends of Rock as of March 6, 2008, and featured again as part of the Avenged Sevenfold track pack for Guitar Hero 5. The song is also featured in Rock Band 2 and Need for Speed: ProStreet.

In December 2008 it was announced that the USC Trojan Marching Band would perform the song at the Rose Bowl halftime show on January 1, 2009.

Track listing

UK promo single
 "Almost Easy" – 3:55
UK single
 "Almost Easy" – 3:56
 "Almost Easy (live)" – 3:53

Note: Both versions have exactly the same album version of "Almost Easy" (except for the live version). Simply, in the UK single version, the track has one more second of silence at the end.

Music video
The band released a video for "Almost Easy" with director P.R. Brown. The video debuted on Fuse's The Sauce on September 24, 2007 and MTV2's Unleashed on October 1, 2007.

The video shows the band playing on a barren wasteland whilst they appear to be aflame. Over a ridge, a huge crowd of hundreds of people appear, walking in a zombie-like fashion towards the band, only to stop at a large gaping hole and jump downwards, into what appears to be Hell. Special effects show some parts where the people have skulls for faces.

At the end of the video, when the last person jumps down the cavern, the camera zooms out from the band, showing that the hole the people were jumping into was actually the eye of the bands recognizable logo from the Avenged Sevenfold album cover, the "Deathbat". The band stated in an interview with Fuse host Steven Smith on Steven's Untitled Rock Show that the inspiration for the video came from a Wendy's commercial they saw in Asia in which a large crowd is running toward the same hamburger.

M. Shadows then said "Wouldn't it be cool if we (Avenged Sevenfold) were playing in a fiery blaze and a bunch of people were running towards us," an idea that would eventually become the video. As of April 2020, it has over 40 million views on YouTube.

Personnel
Avenged Sevenfold
M. Shadows – lead vocals, backing vocals
Zacky Vengeance – rhythm guitar, backing vocals
The Rev - drums, percussion, piano, backing vocals
Synyster Gates – lead guitar, backing vocals
Johnny Christ – bass guitar, backing vocals

Session musicians
Piano by Greg Kusten
Production
Produced by Avenged Sevenfold
Engineered by Fred Archambault and Dave Schiffman, assisted by Clifton Allen, Chris Steffen, Robert DeLong, Aaron Walk, Mike Scielzi, and Josh Wilbur
Mixed by Andy Wallace
Mastered by Brian Gardner
Drum tech by Mike Fasano
Guitar tech by Walter Rice
'Fan Producers for a Day' (MVI) by Daniel McLaughlin and Christopher Guinn

CLA mix
On the Diamonds in the Rough EP album an alternate mix of "Almost Easy" is included. This version, mixed by Chris Lord-Alge (hence the name), included triggered drums, louder guitars and pianos.

Charts

Certifications

References

Avenged Sevenfold songs
2007 singles
2007 songs
Warner Records singles
Thrash metal songs